Urocoptis is a genus of air-breathing land snails, terrestrial pulmonate gastropod molluscs in the family Urocoptidae.

Urocoptis is the type genus of the family Urocoptidae.

References

Further reading 
 Clench W. J. 1968. Notes on species of Urocoptis described by George C. Spence. Proceedings of the Malacological Society of London 38: 101-102. (abstract)

Urocoptidae